Tun Suhailah binti Mohamed Noah (26 October 1931 – 4 October 2014) was the widow of the 3rd Malaysian Prime Minister Hussein Onn and the Spouse of the Prime Minister of Malaysia from 15 January 1976, until 16 July 1981. She was the mother of Hishammuddin Hussein, who is the former Minister of Defence.

Biography
Suhailah Noah was born on 26 October 1931 in Muar, Johor. Her father, Mohamed Noah Omar, was the first Speaker of the Dewan Rakyat (1959–1964). Suhailah's sister, Rahah Noah, is the widow of 2nd Prime Minister Abdul Razak Hussein, and the mother of 6th Prime Minister Najib Razak.

Suhailah married Hussein Onn in 1948. They had six children, including their fourth child, Hishammuddin Hussein. All of their children are maternal cousins of Malaysia's 6th Prime Minister Najib Razak. Their eldest daughter, Datin Roquaiya Hanim (born 1950), died from breast cancer in 2006.

Hussein Onn served as Prime Minister from 1976 to 1981, making Suhailah the Spouse of the Prime Minister of Malaysia. In 1977, Suhailah Noah founded the  Welfare Association of Wives of Ministers and Deputy Ministers (Bakti), which she headed until 1981. Her husband died on 29 May 1990.

Suhailah was awarded the title of "Tun" by the Federal Government of Malaysia in 1990.

Death
Suhaila Noah died on 4 October 2014, at 12:30 a.m. in Damansara Specialist Hospital in Damansara Utama, Petaling Jaya, Selangor, at the age of 82. Her funeral and burial was held at the Makam Pahlawan (Heroes Mausoleum) in Masjid Negara, Kuala Lumpur. She was buried near the grave of her husband, Hussein Onn (inside dome) and the grave of her father, Mohamed Noah Omar. Prior to her death, she resided as well as spending her old age in Bukit Tunku, Kuala Lumpur, which was her family's residence in the Greater Kuala Lumpur area.

Honours

Honours of Malaysia
  : 
 Grand Commander of the Order of Loyalty to the Crown of Malaysia (SSM) – Tun (1990)
  :
  Knight Grand Commander of the Order of the Crown of Terengganu (SPMT) – Dato' (1977)

See also
 Spouse of the Prime Minister of Malaysia

References

Noah, Suhaila
2014 deaths
People from Muar
People from Johor
Malaysian people of Malay descent
Malaysian people of Bugis descent
Spouses of prime ministers of Malaysia
Spouses of Deputy Prime Ministers of Malaysia
Grand Commanders of the Order of Loyalty to the Crown of Malaysia
Knights Grand Commander of the Order of the Crown of Terengganu